Case of the Missing Hare is a 1942 Warner Bros. cartoon in the Merrie Melodies series, directed by Chuck Jones and starring Bugs Bunny. The short was released on December 12, 1942.

Plot
A bald magician named Ala Bahma nails self-promoting posters everywhere, including a tree in which Bugs is living. Bugs protests having his home encroached and his right to private property compromised, until the magician apologizes and offers Bugs a blackberry pie. After Ala Bahma magically brandishes the pie from underneath his cloth and splatters it in Bugs's face, Bugs vows revenge.

At the Bijou theater, Bugs disrupts Ala Bahma through a series of public humiliations: replacing himself with a carrot and repeating Ala Bahma's hat-trick, and later grabbing another carrot after hitting Ala Bahma with his own mallet. Eventually, the magician barricades his own hat with wood planks and nails to make sure that Bugs does not get out.

Later, Ala Bahma performs an Indian Basket Trick with Bugs posing as a volunteer. During his trick, he puts the swords in the basket. When Ala Bahma discovers that Bugs has snuck out from behind him while feigning pain, Bugs tries jumping into his hat but hits it on the barricade. Ala Bahma charges at Bugs to kill him, but Bugs plays a statues game on the magician. Once Ala Bahma gets close enough, Bugs dresses up as a fencer for Ala Bahma to fight him. Bugs escapes to the balcony to heckle Ala Bahma ("What a performance, D'Artagnan, what a performance!"). Realizing his mistake, Ala Bahma fires a shotgun at Bugs. However, Bugs places an exploding cigar in Ala Bahma's mouth and splatters the pie in his face. Bugs performs "Aloha 'Oe" on a ukulele as he descends into the hat.

Production notes
This is one of the few cartoons where Bugs Bunny does not say his catchphrase, "What's up, Doc?", though he does address the magician as "Doc" early in the film. It is also one of few cartoons in the character's filmography to fall into the public domain, due to the failure of the last copyright holder, United Artists Television, to renew the original copyright within the allotted 28-year period.

Background artists Gene Fleury and John McGrew reduced most of the backgrounds to the film to patterns (stripes, zig-zags, etc.) and colored cards. The result was outlandish but Fleury recalled Leon Schlesinger congratulating them. In the theater setting of the film, these backgrounds could be rationalized to represent stage flats.

Michael S. Shull and David E. Wilt consider it ambiguous if this cartoon contained a World War II–related reference. Bugs Bunny pronounces the phrase "Of course you realize, this means war" in a gruff voice that may have been intended as an imitation of Winston Churchill, though it was also used several times in Duck Soup.

See also
List of Bugs Bunny cartoons

References

Sources

External links
Complete film with closed captions

 Watch Case of the Missing Hare in fully restored HD at Laugh Bureau Vintage
The Case of the Missing Hare on the Internet Archive

1942 films
1942 short films
1942 animated films
1940s animated short films
Merrie Melodies short films
Short films directed by Chuck Jones
Films about magic and magicians
Films set in a theatre
Films scored by Carl Stalling
Bugs Bunny films
Films produced by Leon Schlesinger
1940s Warner Bros. animated short films